Marc Robert Stanley is an American trial lawyer, political activist, Jewish community leader, and philanthropist who has served as the United States Ambassador to Argentina since 2022.

Early life and education 
Born to a Jewish family, Stanley received a Bachelor of Business Administration from the George Washington University in 1979 and a Juris Doctor from the University of Texas School of Law in 1982.

Career 
His national public service began in college, when he worked four years for the U.S. Congress, serving with Representatives Mo Udall (D-AZ) and Dale Kildee (D-MI), and with the Committee on House Administration as an aide to Chairman Frank Thompson (D-NJ). In that role, he created the first Telephone Directory for the U.S. House of Representatives, serving as its Editor from 1977 to 1979. He later served as Dallas County chair for Senator Lloyd Bentsen's campaign in 1988 and Governor Ann Richards' campaign from 1989 to 1990.

Stanley is founder of the Stanley Law Group, a Dallas-based firm that focuses on national class actions and litigation.

Stanley is a member of the board of directors of both the Texas Trial Lawyers Association and the Dallas Trial Lawyers Association. He has been voted a "Best Lawyer in Dallas" and a "Super Lawyer" for the entire state of Texas for every year since the accolades were established.

Stanley has served as a board member and leader of many Jewish charitable and political organizations, including six years as Chairman of the National Jewish Democratic Council.

Stanley also chaired the Legacy Senior Communities, Inc., a Jewish-sponsored, not-for-profit charitable organization providing continuing care retirement communities and in-home care for seniors and their families.

Stanley serves on the executive committee of the Israel Policy Forum. He previously served as chairman of the Texas Public Finance Authority (appointed by Texas Governor Ann Richards). Secretary of Defense William Cohen appointed Stanley as a member of the board of visitors of the Air University.

In 2011, Stanley was appointed by President Barack Obama as a council-member of the United States Holocaust Memorial Museum.

United States ambassador to Argentina 
On August 6, 2021, President Joe Biden announced his intent to nominate Stanley to be the next United States Ambassador to Argentina. On August 10, 2021, his nomination was sent to the Senate. Hearings were held on his nomination before the Senate Foreign Relations Committee on October 26, 2021. He was reported out of committee on December 15, 2021 and was confirmed by the Senate via voice vote on December 18, 2021. Judge Karen Gren Scholer, U.S District Court for the Northern District of Texas, administered the oath of office to Stanley on December 21, 2021. He presented his credentials to President Alberto Fernández on January 24, 2022.

Personal life 
Stanley and his wife, Wendy, have three children.

References

External links

Year of birth missing (living people)
Living people
21st-century American diplomats
Ambassadors of the United States to Argentina
George Washington University School of Business alumni
Jewish American government officials
Texas lawyers
Texas Democrats
University of Texas School of Law alumni